Ken Dineen (3 September 1917 – 1 November 2002) was an  Australian rules footballer who played with South Melbourne in the Victorian Football League (VFL).

Dinnen was a pilot during World War II and his plane was put down by Japanese fighters. He was rescued by the Fuzzy Wuzzy Angels of Papua New Guinea.

Dineen was cleared to Camberwell Football Club midway through 1945.

Notes

External links 

1917 births
2002 deaths
Australian rules footballers from Victoria (Australia)
Sydney Swans players
Camberwell Football Club players
Royal Australian Air Force personnel of World War II
Royal Australian Air Force officers
Australian World War II pilots
Shot-down aviators
Military personnel from Victoria (Australia)